The Witch Creek Fire, also known as the Witch Fire and the Witch-Guejito–Poomacha Complex Fire, was the second-largest wildfire of the 2007 California wildfire season, and the largest one of the October 2007 California wildfires. Initially igniting in Witch Creek Canyon, near Santa Ysabel, the Witch Creek Fire rapidly spread westward, fanned by powerful Santa Ana winds, and consumed large portions of San Diego County. On October 25, the Witch Fire merged with the Poomacha Fire to the north, near Palomar Mountain, before also merging with the smaller McCoy Fire on the next day. The Witch–Poomacha Complex Fire was the second-to-last fire of the 2007 October wildfires to be extinguished, with the Poomacha Fire being contained on November 13. The last remaining fire, the Harris Fire, was fully extinguished on November 16. During its duration, 80–100 feet-high flames were reported by fire officials in the Witch Fire, and the Witch Fire exhibited the characteristics of a firestorm at its height.

On the morning of October 22, 2007, about a day after the Witch Creek Fire had ignited, residents of San Diego County were ordered to evacuate through the Reverse 911 system. Eventually, the Witch Creek Fire led to the evacuations of 500,000 people, 200,000 of whom lived within the City of San Diego. This evacuation came almost four years to the day after the Cedar Fire of 2003. The Witch Fire was a major contributor to the mass evacuations across much of Southern California at that time, which saw 1,000,000 residents evacuate, becoming the largest evacuation in California history. The Witch–Poomacha Fire caused at least $1.3 billion (2007 USD) in insured damages alone, becoming the costliest wildfire of 2007. As of 2020, the Witch Fire is the fourteenth-largest wildfire in modern California history, as well as the sixth-most destructive wildfire on record in California.

Fire progression

The Witch Creek Fire started in Witch Creek Canyon near Santa Ysabel, at 12:35 PM PDT on Sunday, October 21, 2007, after powerful Santa Ana winds blew down a power line, releasing sparks into the wind. The Witch Fire quickly spread to San Diego Country Estates, Ramona, Rancho Bernardo, Poway, and Escondido. From there, the fire jumped over Interstate 15 and continued west, causing significant damage in Lake Hodges, Del Dios, and Rancho Santa Fe.

Strong Santa Ana winds pushed the fires west towards the coast. San Diego County Sheriff William B. Kolendar stated that the Witch Creek Fire could be "well in excess of the Cedar Fire of 2003". While many coastal communities were evacuated as the fire moved west, the shifting winds prevented it from directly threatening those areas. At 11:37 PM PDT on October 21, the McCoy Fire ignited in the Pine Hills area in eastern San Diego County, near Cleveland National Forest. The fire was quickly contained on October 23, after burning ; however, hotspots within the fire perimeter would continue to burn until October 26, when the wildfire eventually merged with the expanding Witch Fire.

The extremely powerful Santa Ana winds fanned the wildfires in Southern California, causing many of the wildfires to rapidly expand westward. At 1:30 AM PDT on October 22, 2007, the Guejito Fire ignited southeast of the San Diego Wild Animal Park, within the San Pasqual River drainage. By 4:30 AM PDT, the Guejito Fire rapidly expanded to Interstate 15, forcing the closure of the freeway in both directions, which disrupted some evacuations from areas affected by the Witch Creek Fire. In less than an hour, the Witch Creek Fire caught up with the Guejito Fire to the west, and the two fires combined into a single, massive wildfire, before dawn. On the morning of October 22, at 5:22 AM PDT, residents located between the Del Dios Highway and State Route 56 were ordered to evacuate. A firefighter stated that the conditions they faced were "twice as bad" as the Cedar Fire in 2003, with firefighters separating houses into those that they could save and those that they couldn't. The Witch Creek Fire had become a firestorm by this time, exhibiting extreme fire behavior and long-range spotting. The Witch Creek Fire continued to race westward, and by 9:25 PM PDT, on October 22, mandatory evacuation orders had been expanded westward to Escondido and Del Mar, all the way up to the coast. By 9:30 P.M. PDT on October 22, a dispatch from the city of Del Mar's web site stated: "For your safety, we are strongly advising that all Del Mar residents evacuate." Evacuations were also ordered for Scripps Ranch neighborhood, specifically "Everything south of Scripps Poway Parkway, north of MCAS Miramar, east of Interstate 15, and west of Highway 67". The Mesa Grande Indian Reservation was also evacuated due to the Witch Fire. Residents of the Barona Indian Reservation were advised to leave, though the evacuation was not mandatory. The casino on the reservation was closed. At approximately 01:00 UTC on October 23 (6:00 PM PDT on October 22), the Witch Fire expanded near Wildcat Canyon to the south of Barona, where many houses had been destroyed and lives lost in the Cedar Fire. Residents of Wildcat Canyon and Muth Valley were ordered to evacuate, and the road was closed. By the end of October 22, the Witch Creek Fire had exploded to an enormous , and the fire was still rapidly expanding.

During the late afternoon of October 23, evacuations of Del Mar, Chula Vista, Poway, Del Mar Heights, and Scripps Ranch were lifted for many residents. At 3:13 AM PDT, on October 23, 2007, the Poomacha Fire was ignited in the La Jolla Indian Reservation in northeastern San Diego County. At 9:50 P.M. PDT on October 23, 2007, the town of Julian, California was ordered to evacuate. Due to the fires, there was no power or phone service in the town.

On Wednesday, October 24, 2007, the Santa Ana winds began to subside and the prevailing winds shifted directions, with the onshore flow blowing in from the west, which caused the Witch Creek Fire to reverse directions and begin burning eastward, ending the threat to the coastal communities. This also allowed the fire to burn previously-unburned fuel (which was passed over during the initial rapid spread of the fire), threatening communities further east that had so far avoided the worst of the Witch Creek Fire. On the same day, some of the evacuation orders in place for Rancho Bernardo, Rancho Peñasquitos, 4S Ranch, and other areas west of Rancho Bernardo were lifted, after the western part of the Witch Creek Fire was contained. However, the evacuation orders in place for eastern and northern Rancho Bernardo, around Lake Hodges, were still in place. On October 25, more of the evacuation orders for the Witch Fire around Rancho Bernardo and other neighboring communities were lifted, as the Witch Creek Fire became 45% contained, with the western portion of the fire being brought under control.

On October 24, the California Highway Patrol closed Interstate 5, after the Ammo Fire burned across the freeway; the Ammo Fire also forced the closures of the Amtrak California Surfliner service between Oceanside and San Clemente. These routes had previously been used to evacuate residents from the Witch Creek Fire areas. Traffic from Interstate 5 was diverted to Interstate 15, which had reopened since the portion of the Witch Creek Fire around Interstate 15 had been extinguished. Late on October 24, after the winds had reversed, the Witch Fire began approaching the nearby Poomacha Fire to the north, which was burning near Palomar Mountain, with firefighters and officials fearing that the two wildfires would soon merge. Despite the fact that the Poomacha Fire was still much smaller than the Witch Creek Fire, firefighters were unable to establish a fire perimeter around the younger fire, due to the fact that other larger fires had rendered available firefighters and equipment scarce for the Poomacha Fire. On October 25, the Witch Fire and the Poomacha Fire merged into one gigantic complex fire, with the two wildfires joining to the south of Palomar Mountain. By October 26, the Santa Ana winds had finally subsided and the onshore flow had fully returned, slowing down the spread of the remaining fires and also aiding firefighters in their efforts to contain the remaining wildfires. On the same day, the Witch Fire also merged with the contained McCoy Fire, which had previously burned 400 acres in the Pine Hills area, in eastern San Diego County.

On November 6, 2007, the main portion of the Witch Creek Fire was 100% contained, although the Poomacha portion of the complex fire continued to burn near Palomar Mountain for another week. On November 13, 2007, the Poomacha Fire was fully contained, bringing the entire Witch–Poomacha Complex Fire completely under control.

Impacts
The Witch Creek Fire forced the evacuation of at least 500,000 people from over 346,000 homes in San Diego County. Evacuation sites in San Diego County included Qualcomm Stadium, Escondido High School, Mission Hills High School, Poway High School, Mira Mesa Senior High School, and the Del Mar Fairgrounds.

Many major roads were also closed as a result of the fires and smoke. On October 22, the California Highway Patrol closed Interstate 15 in both directions between State Routes 78 and 56. On October 24, 2007, the Ammo (Horno) Fire forced the closure of Interstate 5, as well as the Amtrak California Surfliner service between Oceanside and San Clemente. Traffic from Interstate 5 was being diverted to Interstate 15, which had reopened. A total of 1,841 firefighters were assigned to the Witch Fire.

Aftermath
In addition to the costs of fighting the fire, the Witch–Poomacha Fire is estimated to have caused an estimated $1.3 billion in insured damages, with the original Witch Fire causing over $1.142 billion in insured damages alone.

The California Public Utilities Commission ruled that in the Rice fire, San Diego Gas and Electric had not trimmed back trees as state law requires. It was also at fault, the commission said, in the Witch and Guejito fires. The power line that caused the Witch fires shorted three times in three hours, but the utility didn't cut power to it for six hours.

In August 2017, administrative law Judges S. Pat Tsen and Sasha Goldberg ruled that the utility did not reasonably manage its facilities and that the wildfires were not outside of its control. Therefore, they ruled that the utility could not pass its uninsured costs along to its ratepayers. The PUC agreed in early December in a 5-0 vote.

The Rice Fire began when a dead tree limb fell across power lines. The Rice Fire burned , also burning across Interstate 15 in northern San Diego County, and destroyed 206 homes. The Witch and Guejito Fires combined to burn 197,000 acres, killed two people, injured 40 firefighters, and destroyed 1,141 homes and 239 vehicles. Legal claims after the fires totalled $5.6 billion, $2.4 billion after the utility settled 2,500 lawsuits for damages. The $379 million it had sought to pass along to customers represented uninsured costs.

See also

October 2007 California wildfires
Harris Fire
Cedar Fire (2003)
2005 Labor Day brush fire
May 2014 San Diego County wildfires
2016 California wildfires
Tubbs Fire
December 2017 Southern California wildfires
Thomas Fire
Lilac Fire
List of California wildfires

References

External links

Witch Fire Threatens To Merge With Poomacha Fire - ABC 10News, Archived on November 19, 2018
Interagency State BAER Report: The Witch Fire
Largest fires in San Diego County history - ABC 10News
Southern California's Worst Brush Fires

2007 California wildfires
Wildfires in San Diego County, California
East County (San Diego County)
North County (San Diego County)
Escondido, California
Poway, California
Ramona, San Diego County, California
Rancho Santa Fe, California